The Flemish Giant rabbit is the largest breed of domestic rabbit (Oryctolagus cuniculus domesticus). Flemish Giants are historically a utility breed used for their fur and meat. They are often kept as pets as they are known for being docile and patient when being handled.

History

The Flemish Giant originated in Flanders. It was bred as early as the 16th century near the city of Ghent, Belgium.
Thomas Coatoam, in his Origins of the Flemish Giants, states that "The earliest authentic record of the Flemish Giant Rabbit occurred about the year 1860."
 

The first standards for the breed were written in 1893. The Flemish Giant is an ancestor of many rabbit breeds from all over the world, one of which is the Belgian Hare, which was imported into England in the mid-19th century. The Flemish Giant was exported from England and Belgium to America in the early 1890s to increase the size of meat rabbits during the great "rabbit boom".

The breed received little attention until about 1910, when it started appearing at small livestock shows throughout the country. Today, it is one of the more popular breeds at rabbit shows due to its unusually large size and varying colors. It is promoted by the National Federation of Flemish Giant Rabbit Breeders, which was formed in 1915. The Flemish Giant has many nicknames, including the "Gentle Giant" for its uniquely docile personality, and the "universal rabbit" for its varied purposes as a pet, show, breeding, meat, and fur animal.

Flemish giants are also popular as pets, especially in Europe and North America. Although they are large, they are known to exhibit cleanliness and can be trained to use a litter box.

Appearance
 As one of the largest breeds of domestic rabbit, the Flemish Giant is a semi-arch type rabbit with its back arch starting behind the shoulders and carrying through to the base of the tail, giving a "mandolin" shape. The body of a Flemish Giant Rabbit is long and powerful, with relatively broad hindquarters. The fur of the Flemish Giant is glossy and dense. When stroked from the hindquarters to the head, the fur will roll back to its original position.

Bucks have a broad, massive head in comparison to does, and can take 1.5 years to reach full maturity. Does may have a large, full, evenly carried dewlap (the fold of skin under their chins), and can take 1 year to reach full maturity.

The American Rabbit Breed Association (ARBA) standard recognizes seven different colors for the breed: black, blue, fawn, sandy, light gray, steel gray, and white. The world's largest rabbit is Darius, a Flemish Giant rabbit that weighs  and measures .

Behaviour and lifestyle

Flemish Giants can be docile and tolerant of being handled if they frequently have interactions with humans. Flemish Giants, like all rabbits and other animals, can become fearful and sometimes aggressive if handled incorrectly or irresponsibly. Their larger frame requires that one handling a Flemish Giant pay special attention to its spine alignment. Consequently, potential owners should consider these factors in addition to their size, level of food consumption, and substantial waste production before deciding to get one as a pet.

Due to its large size, the Flemish Giant needs substantial living quarters that provide ample opportunity for physical movement. The House Rabbit Society recommends keeping rabbits inside the home in a very large pen or room(s) in the home. Larger dog crates are often more appropriate than traditional rabbit and small-pet cages, which tend to be smaller and shorter. In the United States Department of Agriculture's standards for animal housing, rabbits over  must have at least  of floor space. The size of appropriate living quarters increases with size of the rabbit.

Cages with incorrectly sized wire gauge bottoms (as opposed to small gauge wire or solid bottoms) can harm the feet of a Flemish Giant more so than smaller house rabbits due to their increased weight. A resting board may be required to prevent sore hocks for a larger breed rabbit. The Flemish Giant will require larger quantities of food compared to smaller breeds of domestic rabbits. Like some other short hair breeds of rabbits, the Flemish Giant will usually require mild attention to grooming due to its shorter hair. Shedding during the spring and fall transition periods tend to be the most dramatic, with smaller sheds often occurring in between.

Diet

Flemish Giants can be fed like other rabbits, with the amount of food increased to match their larger size. ARBA recommendations include hay and occasional treats.

A high protein diet of 16% enables the rabbit to gain bone mass while it is growing, and later in gaining muscle mass. Small amounts of apples, cabbage, or broccoli given as treats and slowly increased do not harm the health of the rabbit; for instance, a rabbit consuming a quarter of an apple every other day can safely be fed half an apple with the same frequency after three weeks. (However, feeding the apple core or seeds to the rabbit may be harmful, as said core and seeds contain cyanide.) Flemish Giants do not reach full size until they are 1.5 years old, and consume a large amount of food during this time. After females deliver kits, and during winter for all Flemish Giants, the rabbits must be fed as much as they can eat, and given plenty of water.

Obesity due to overfeeding is a major health concern for both commercial and pet rabbits. Excess protein, calories, and minerals such as salt and calcium, often provided when the rabbit-owner is supplementing a commercial diet, can also cause kidney stones.

The House Rabbit Society recommends two cups of chopped leafy vegetables per  of body weight and no more than two tablespoons of fruit or carrots per  of body weight daily.

Breeding
The American Rabbit Breeders' Association (ARBA) recommends delaying breeding of female rabbits until they reach the senior weight range. A  Flemish Giant can take up to 1.5 years to reach their maximum weight and a breeder should wait until the rabbit is slightly over a year old before breeding. Females and males can become sexually mature at 4 months and 8 days. Once the rabbits are 3 months old they should be kept in separate cages or put females with females and males with males. If fighting occurs, then they must be separated. The breeding lifespan of a rabbit is variable. Some breeders prefer not to have any more litters after the age of three years, while others continue to produce quality litters for five to eight years. The gestation period is between 28–31 days. On average, they give birth at 30–32 days. The Flemish Giant rabbit can produce large litters, usually between 5 and 12 in a litter.

4-H and show
Flemish Giants, due to their uncomplicated grooming requirements and docile personalities, are used by 4-H programs throughout the United States as a starter rabbit for teaching children responsibility and care of farm animals and pets. Another popular youth program outside 4-H that promotes responsible show breeding is the National Federation of Flemish Giant Breeders Youth Program.
Flemish Giants are the second-oldest domesticated rabbit breed in the United States, following behind the now rare Belgian Hare.

See also

French Lop
British Giant rabbit
Continental Giant rabbit
Angora rabbit
Domestic rabbit
List of rabbit breeds

References

Rabbit breeds
Rabbits as pets
Rabbit breeds originating in Belgium